Pinara metaphaea, the pinara moth, is a species of moth of the family Lasiocampidae. It was first described by Francis Walker in 1862. It is known from south-east Australia, including New South Wales and Victoria.

The wingspan is about 40 mm for males and about 60 mm for females. Males have brown forewings shading darker at the bases, and dark brown hindwings with broad orange margins. Females have pale grey or brown forewings, each with a submarginal arc of dark dots. The hindwings are darker with broad white margins.

The larvae feed on the foliage of Eucalyptus species.

References

Lasiocampidae
Moths of Australia
Moths described in 1862